The following is a list of fictional astronauts from recent times, mostly using the Space Shuttle and International Space Station, as depicted in works released between 2000 and 2009.

2000–2009

Notes

References

Lists of fictional astronauts